Maybelle is a feminine given name that may refer to
Maybelle Blair (born 1927), American baseball player
Maybelle Carter (1909–1978), American country musician
Maybelle Stephens Mitchell (1872–1919), American suffragist
Maybelle Reichardt (1907–1999), American discus thrower
Big Maybelle (1924–1972), American R&B singer

See also
Maybelle and Ezra Carter House in Scott County, Virginia, U.S.

English-language feminine given names